At the Grand Balcony (French: Au grand balcon) is a 1949 French drama film directed by Henri Decoin and starring Pierre Fresnay, Georges Marchal and Félix Oudart. It was entered into the 1949 Cannes Film Festival. The film's sets were designed by the art director René Renoux.

Synopsis
The plot revolves around the founding of the French pioneering aviation company Aéropostale in the years after the First World War. Led by the war veteran Carbot they attempt to establish a commercial airline that can connect the far reaches of French territory. It takes its name from the real-life Hôtel du Grand Balcon in Toulouse where the various characters stay.

Cast
 Pierre Fresnay as Carbot
 Georges Marchal as Jean Fabien
 Félix Oudart as Garandoux
 Janine Crispin as Maryse 
 Germaine Michel as Mlle Adeline
 Abel Jacquin as Darbouin
 André Bervil as Triolet
 Clément Thierry as Didier Fusain
 Paul Azaïs as Morel
 Jacques Tarride as Macherel
 Nina Myral as  Mme Viard
 André Darnay as Armezac
 Pierre Cressoy as Charlier
 Jean Gaven as  Belfort

References

Bibliography
 Dayna Oscherwitz & MaryEllen Higgins. The A to Z of French Cinema. Scarecrow Press, 2009.

External links

1949 films
1949 drama films
1940s French-language films
French black-and-white films
Films directed by Henri Decoin
Films produced by Raymond Borderie
French aviation films
French drama films
Films set in the 1920s
Films set in France
Films scored by Joseph Kosma
1940s French films